Navaikulam is a panchayat in Varkala Taluk of Thiruvananthapuram district in the state of Kerala, India. It is situated 11km east of Varkala town and 37km north of Trivandrum City along NH66. 

The term "navaya" means "the place where Vedic scriptures are taught".  Therefore, it is believed that Navaikulam was an ancient center of excellence and wisdom.  The Sankaranarayana temple is situated here.

Demographics
 India census, Navaikulam had a population of 27703 with 13084 males and 14619 females.

Sankaranarayana temple
The Sri Sankaranarayana temple at Navaikulam in Varkala Taluk of Trivandrum district is located by the side of National Highway 47 between Kallambalam and Parippally (about 45 km north of Trivandrum). Set amidst a vast campus, the temple enshrines the syncretic image of Sankaranarayana, whose left half shows the attributes of Vishnu and the right half that of Siva, this is believed to be the biggest Shankaranarayana statue in standing position.  It is one of the most famous pilgrim center in Thiruvananthapuram district. Near the temple there is a big pond. This temple is 1000 years old.

Govt, HSS navaikulam
It is a school in the Attingal education district. Approximately 2000 students are enrolled in the school, which is staffed by around 80 teachers. The library in the school has an amazing collection of books. Proper lab facilities are available. In sports and arts, this school is number one in the Attingal education district.

State Government Offices
 Navaikulam, Sub Registrar Officer

References

Villages in Thiruvananthapuram district